Ash Creek is a  long stream located to the east of the Cascade Range in northeastern California, flowing through Lassen County and Modoc County. It drains a semi-arid watershed composed mainly of volcanic hills and agricultural valleys.

It flows northwest through a canyon into Ambrose Valley, past the Ash Creek Campground, then crosses into Modoc County and enters Round Valley where it turns southwest. At Adin, the creek is crossed by Highway 299 after passing through a gap in the hills into the much larger Big Valley, where it flows west roughly along the Modoc-Lassen county line. Near its terminus the creek feeds an extensive wetlands area known as Big Swamp, part of the Ash Creek State Wildlife Area.

Although located in a semi-desert region the flow of Ash Creek is perennial. The California Department of Fish and Wildlife calls Ash Creek "one of the most remote, least improved and most pristine" wildlife areas in California. The upper part of the creek, in the Modoc National Forest, is stocked annually with fish.

See also
List of rivers of California

References

Rivers of Modoc County, California
Rivers of Lassen County, California